Toveyleh-ye Bozorg (also Romanized as Ţoveyleh-ye Bozorg, Ţavīleh Bozorg, Tavilehé Bozorg, and Ţavīleh-ye Bozorg; also known as Ţoveyleh-ye Bozorg-e Ḩājj Yāser and Ţoveyleh-ye Bozorg-e Ḩāj Yāser) is a village in Gheyzaniyeh Rural District, in the Central District of Ahvaz County, Khuzestan Province, Iran. At the 2006 census, its population was 49, in 11 families.

References 

Populated places in Ahvaz County